Adam Carroll may refer to:

 Adam Carroll (racing driver) (born 1982), Northern Irish racing driver
 Adam Carroll (American musician) (born 1975), American musician